Sogra is a rural locality (a village) and the administrative center of Gorkovskoye Rural Settlement of Verkhnetoyemsky District, Arkhangelsk Oblast, Russia. The population was 523 as of 2010. There are 18 streets.

Geography 
Sogra is located 122 km northeast of Verkhnyaya Toyma (the district's administrative centre) by road. Keras is the nearest rural locality.

References 

Rural localities in Verkhnetoyemsky District